This is a list of the notable people who have participated in the CIF California State Meet.  It includes their results at the CIF California State Meet, cross referenced to a highlight of their notable achievements.  For the majority of these athletes, this meet was the last NFHS sanctioned meet of their high school career.

High school track and field competitions in the United States
College track and field competitions in the United States
Recurring sporting events established in 1915
High school sports in California